Le Faou is a commune in the Finistère department of Brittany in north-western France.

Population
Inhabitants of Le Faou are called in French Faouistes.

Events
The commune contains the village of Rumengol, location of a major religious Pardon on August 15 every year.

Breton language
In 2008, 12% of primary-school children attended bilingual schools, where Breton language is taught alongside French.

See also
Communes of the Finistère department
List of works of the two Folgoët ateliers
Parc naturel régional d'Armorique

References

External links
Official website 

Mayors of Finistère Association 

Communes of Finistère
Plus Beaux Villages de France